The Koide formula is an unexplained empirical equation discovered by Yoshio Koide in 1981. In its original form, it relates the masses of the three charged leptons; later authors have extended the relation to neutrinos, quarks, and other families of particles.

Formula
The Koide formula is

where the masses of the electron, muon, and tau are measured respectively as  = ,  = , and  = ; the digits in parentheses are the uncertainties in the last digits. This gives  = . 

No matter what masses are chosen to stand in place of the electron, muon, and tau,  The upper bound follows from the fact that the square roots are necessarily positive, and the lower bound follows from the Cauchy–Bunyakovsky–Schwarz inequality. The experimentally determined value, lies at the center of the mathematically allowed range. But note that removing the requirement of positive roots it is possible to fit an extra tuple in the quark sector (the one with strange, charm and bottom).

The mystery is in the physical value. Not only is the result peculiar, in that three ostensibly arbitrary numbers give a simple fraction, but also in that in the case of electron, muon, and tau,  is exactly halfway between the two extremes of all possible combinations:  (if the three masses were equal) and 1 (if one mass dominates). 

Robert Foot also interpreted the Koide formula as a geometrical relation, in which the value  is the squared cosine of the angle between the vector  and the vector  (see dot product). That angle is almost exactly 45 degrees: 

When the formula is assumed to hold exactly ( = ), it may be used to predict the tau mass from the (more precisely known) electron and muon masses; that prediction is  = . Please note that solving the Koide formula can also predict the third particle mass to be around 3.37 MeV/c2. 

While the original formula arose in the context of preon models, other ways have been found to derive it (both by Sumino and by Koide – see references below). As a whole, however, understanding remains incomplete. Similar matches have been found for triplets of quarks depending on running masses. With alternating quarks, chaining Koide equations for consecutive triplets, it is possible to reach a result of 173.263947(6) GeV for the mass of the top quark.

Speculative extension 
Carl Brannen has proposed the lepton masses are given by the squares of the eigenvalues of a circulant matrix with real eigenvalues, corresponding to the relation

  for  = 0, 1, 2, ...

which can be fit to experimental data with  = 0.500003(23) (corresponding to the Koide relation) and phase  = 0.2222220(19), which is almost exactly  . However, the experimental data are in conflict with simultaneous equality of η =  and  =  .

Similar formulae
There are similar empirical formulae which relate other masses. 
Quark masses depend on the energy scale used to measure them, which makes an analysis more complicated.

Taking the heaviest three quarks, charm , bottom  and top , regardless of their uncertainties, one arrives at the value cited by F. G. Cao (2012):

 

This was noticed by Rodejohann and Zhang in the first version of their 2011 article, but the observation was removed in the published version, so the first published mention is in 2012 from Cao.

Similarly, the masses of the lightest quarks, up , down , and strange , without using their experimental uncertainties, yield

 

a value also cited by Cao in the same article. 

Note that an older article, H. Harari, et al., calculates theoretical values for up, down and strange quarks, coincidentally matching the later Koide formula, albeit with a massless up-quark. That should be, with modern values,

Running of particle masses
In quantum field theory, quantities like coupling constant and mass "run" with the energy scale. That is, their value depends on the energy scale at which the observation occurs, in a way described by a renormalization group equation (RGE). One usually expects relationships between such quantities to be simple at high energies (where some symmetry is unbroken) but not at low energies, where the RG flow will have produced complicated deviations from the high-energy relation. The Koide relation is exact (within experimental error) for the pole masses, which are low-energy quantities defined at different energy scales. For this reason, many physicists regard the relation as "numerology". 

However, the Japanese physicist Yukinari Sumino has proposed mechanisms to explain origins of the charged lepton spectrum as well as the Koide formula, e.g., by constructing an effective field theory in which a new gauge symmetry causes the pole masses to exactly satisfy the relation. Koide has published his opinions concerning Sumino's model. François Goffinet's doctoral thesis gives a discussion on pole masses and how the Koide formula can be reformulated to avoid needing the square roots of masses.

See also

References

Further reading 

 

 (See the article's references links to "The lepton masses" and "Recent results from the MINOS experiment".)

External links

Wolfram Alpha, link solves for the predicted tau mass from the Koide formula.

Leptons
Unsolved problems in physics
Empirical laws
1980s in science